Longirostromeryx is an extinct genus of musk deer, that lived during the Miocene epoch in what is now central North America. There are three, perhaps four, recognized species: Longirostromeryx blicki, L. clarendoniensis, L. novomexicanus, and L. wellsi.

Notes

References
McKenna, Malcolm C., and Bell, Susan K. 1997. Classification of Mammals Above the Species Level. Columbia University Press, New York, 631 pp. 
 Webb, S.D., 1998. Hornless ruminants. pp. 463–476 in C.M. Janis, K.M. Scott, and L.L. Jacobs (eds.) Evolution of Tertiary Mammals of North America Cambridge University Press, Cambridge. 
 The Book of Life: An Illustrated History of the Evolution of Life on Earth by Jean-Paul Tibbles, Peter Andrews, John Barber, and Michael Benton

Prehistoric musk deer
Miocene even-toed ungulates
Pliocene even-toed ungulates
Piacenzian extinctions
Neogene mammals of North America
Fossil taxa described in 1937
Prehistoric even-toed ungulate genera